Firan or Fəràn is a Plateau language closely related to Izere. Most Firan speakers are multilingual in Firan, Hausa, English, Iten and sometimes Berom.

Phonology

Consonants

Vowels

References

Further reading
A Sociolinguistic Profile of the Firan (fir) Language of Plateau State, Nigeria

Central Plateau languages
Languages of Nigeria